The Jiujiang Yangtze River Expressway Bridge, also known as the Second Jiujiang Bridge, is a cable-stayed bridge over the Yangtze River between Huangmei, Huanggang, in Hubei province and Jiujiang, in Jiangxi province.  The bridge carries six lanes of traffic on the G70 Fuzhou–Yinchuan Expressway and is the second Yangtze River crossing in Jiujiang. Construction of the bridge started on September 27, 2009, and the bridge was completed on October 28, 2013.

The northern approach  consists of the Huangguang Levee Bridge, Fen Road Elevated Bridge and G105 Highway Bridge). The southern approach  consists of the Qili Lake Bridge and the Bridge over the Jingjiu Railway.

See also
Yangtze River bridges and tunnels
List of largest cable-stayed bridges
List of tallest bridges in the world

References 

Bridges over the Yangtze River
Cable-stayed bridges in China
Road bridges in China
Bridges in Hubei
Bridges in Jiangxi
Buildings and structures in Huanggang
Jiujiang
Bridges completed in 2013